The Chamber Music Society of Lincoln Center (CMS) is an American organization dedicated to the performance and promotion of chamber music in New York City. It is the largest organization of its kind in the country for chamber music. CMS's home is Alice Tully Hall, located in New York's Lincoln Center for the Performing Arts.

Founded in 1969 by pianist Charles Wadsworth with the patronage of Alice Tully, the first performance at Alice Tully Hall was September 11, 1969. The current artistic directors are cellist David Finckel and pianist Wu Han.

Overview 
CMS' Alice Tully Hall hosts mainstage performances. The complete Brandenburg Concertos are performed each December, and have been called a "New York holiday staple" by The New York Times. The Daniel and Joanna S. Rose Studio hosts other events, including contemporary compositions, lectures, and classes.

CMS also hosts many education programs for both listeners and musicians, including its Meet the Music! and Inside Chamber Music lecture series.

The Bowers program is a residency program at the Chamber Music Society of Lincoln Center. It was known as CMS Two until it was renamed after a donation by philanthropist Ann S. Bowers. Alumni of the program include Inon Barnatan, Lang Lang, Hilary Hahn, Paul Huang, Nicholas Canellakis, Anthony McGill, Alisa Weilerstein, and the Escher String Quartet.

CMS presents more than 80 concerts per season outside of New York City, including concerts in North America, Europe and Asia.

Artistic Directors 

 Charles Wadsworth (1969–1989)
 Fred Sherry (1989–1993)
 David Shifrin (1993–2004)
 David Finckel and Wu Han (2004–present)

References

External links
 
 

Chamber Music Society of Lincoln Center, The
Chamber Music Society of Lincoln Center, The
Chamber Music Society of Lincoln Center, The
Lincoln Center